Bhavan's Vidya Mandir, Irinjalakuda is a C.B.S.E. affiliated senior secondary school in Irinjalakuda, Thrissur, Kerala, India. It was established in 1992 and is a part of Bharatiya Vidya Bhavan group.

Campus
The school campus is spread over an area of 6.25 acres. It includes the main school building, arts and P.T room, canteen and school auditorium. There are two main grounds for sports activities.

See also
List of schools in Kerala
Bharatiya Vidya Bhavan Educational Trust

References

Schools in Thrissur

External links
CBSE
NCERT
Official website